Port Harcourt International Fashion Week (alternatively known as Native & Vogue) is an annual clothing and fashion event held in the oil capital of Nigeria, Port Harcourt. This event, a part of fashion in Nigeria, first took place in 2013 and continues to be jointly organized by Neo Mantra Ltd and Bruno Creazioni Company. The event lasts three days. Its principal sponsor is the Rivers State government.

The Fashion Week is intended for local and international fashion models and designers to display their talents. It also provides emerging designers a platform to develop their creative expressions. Since its initiation in 2013, the yearly event has showcased several of Africa's top designers such as Paul Van Zyl, Adebayo Jones, Frank Osodi, Ituen Basi and Mai Atafo. Former Miss World, Agbani Darego has served as host for the international exhibition.

See also

List of fashion events

References

External links

Port Harcourt International Fashion Week official website

Fashion events in Nigeria
Culture in Port Harcourt
Recurring events established in 2013
Annual events in Nigeria
Tourist attractions in Port Harcourt
Annual events in Port Harcourt
2013 establishments in Nigeria
2010s establishments in Rivers State
Fashion weeks